Nene (pronounced née-nee) is a word in the language of the Seminole Indians meaning "path" or "trail."

In the city of Tallahassee, Florida, United States, it is often used as the name of streets and roads.  In the Indianhead Acres area it is the norm.

Road names of this style are found in other parts of Florida, such as in and around the Brighton Indian Reservation of the Seminole and related Miccosukee tribe.

References

Seminole culture
Footpaths
Types of streets
Streets in Florida
Transportation in Tallahassee, Florida